Götaland (also  Geatland,  Gothia, Gothland, Gothenland or Gautland) is one of three lands of Sweden and comprises ten provinces. Geographically it is located in the south of Sweden, bounded to the north by Svealand, with the deep woods of Tiveden, Tylöskog and Kolmården marking the border.

Götaland once consisted of petty kingdoms, and their inhabitants were called Gautar in Old Norse. However, the term mainly referred to the population of modern Västergötland. It is agreed that these were the same as the Geats, the people of the hero Beowulf in England's national epic, Beowulf.

The modern state of Sweden started forming when some provinces of Götaland gradually became more and more politically intertwined with those of Svealand. This process can be traced back to at least the 11th century, and would continue for several hundred years. Other parts of modern Götaland were at that time either Danish or Norwegian. The province of Småland, with the historically important city Kalmar on its coast, was sparsely populated and the status of the Baltic island Gotland varied during the Middle Ages. Bohuslän became Swedish first during the 17th century after being lost from Norway, around the same time as Denmark lost Scania, Halland and Blekinge to Sweden.

Etymology 

The earliest possible mentions of the götar is by the 2nd-century geographer Ptolemy, who mentions the Goutai (Γούται in Greek). Later, the Anglo-Saxon epic Beowulf (8th–11th century) is partly set among the Gēatas.  Norwegian and Icelandic sources sometimes use Gautar only for the people of Västergötland, but sometimes as a common ethnic term for the people of both Västergötland and Östergötland. Västergötland appears in medieval Icelandic and Norwegian sources as Gautland (Götland), a form which is not etymologically identical to Götaland.

The name Götaland replaced the old Götland in the 15th century, and it was probably to distinguish the wider region it denoted from the traditional heartland in Västergötland. The name Götaland probably originally referred only to Västergötland and Östergötland, but was later extended to adjoining districts.  The name Götaland is possibly a plural construction and means the "lands of the Geats", where Göta- is the genitive plural of the ethnonym Göt (Geat). The interpretation that the neuter noun -land is a plural and not a singular noun is indicated by Bo Jonsson Grip's will in 1384, where he stated that he donated property in Swerige (Sweden, i.e. Svealand), Österlandom (Finland) and in Göthalandom to monasteries.  Here Götaland appears in the plural form of the dative case.

For the etymology of the element Geat/Gaut/Göt and Goth, see Geat.

History 
Västergötland and Östergötland, once rival kingdoms themselves, constitute Götaland proper. The Geatish kings, however, belong to the domain of Norse mythology. Both Västergötland and Östergötland have large agricultural areas. It was along the coasts and at the agricultural areas as people settled down, villages and towns grew up and the population grew fastest. The large river Göta Älv drains the third largest lake in Europe, Lake Vänern. At its mouth (where Gothenburg emerged during the earlier part of the 17:th century) the population in Västergötland had rights to reach the Cattegat sea. Otherwise the Göta Älv estuary was the border between the Kingdoms of Norway and Denmark.

Geatland is the land in which the medieval hero of the poem Beowulf is said to have lived.

It was only late in the Middle Ages that Götaland began to be perceived as a part of Sweden. In Old Norse and in Old English sources, Gautland/Geatland is still treated as a separate country from Sweden. In Sögubrot af Nokkrum for instance, Kolmården between Svealand and Östergötland is described as the border between Sweden and Ostrogothia (......), and in Hervarar saga, King Ingold I rides to Sweden through Östergötland: Ingi konungr fór með hirð sína ok sveit nokkura ok hafði lítinn her. Hann reið austr um Smáland ok í eystra Gautland ok svá í Svíþjóð. In 1384 Bo Jonsson (Grip) stated in his will that the kingdom consisted of Swerige (Sweden, i.e. Svealand), Österland (i.e. Finland) and Göthaland (i.e. Götaland, as of the 1384 borders).

The small countries to the south – Finnveden, Kind, Möre, Njudung, Tjust, Tveta, Värend, and Ydre – were merged into the province of Småland (literally: [the] "small lands"). Off the coast of Småland was the island of Öland, which became a separate province. Dal to the north west became the province of Dalsland.

Småland, Öland and Dalsland were already seen as lands belonging to Götaland during the Scandinavian Middle Ages (12th–15th century).

Småland was full of deep coniferous forest, especially in the south, and of lesser importance to Götaland compared to the agricultural areas in Västergötland and Östergötland. But on its Baltic Sea coast lay the important town of Kalmar. In 1397, the Kalmar Union was proclaimed at Kalmar Castle, a personal union of the three countries of Sweden, Denmark and Norway under one King – or initially one Queen, as Queen Margaret I became the first sovereign of this, the largest ever of Scandinavian states.
 

In the Treaty of Roskilde (1658), the kingdom of Denmark-Norway ceded the Danish provinces of Blekinge, Halland, Scania, and Norwegian province of Bohuslän to Sweden. These provinces are since then counted as parts of Götaland.

The island of Gotland shifted allegiance between the Swedes and the Danes several times. Although the island may be perceived to have closer links to Svealand, it is counted as part of Götaland.

Värmland originally belonged to the Göta Court of Appeal, but the province changed to become part of the Court of Appeal for Svealand for a period of time in the early 19th century.

Provinces and counties 
Today, Götaland has no administrative function and is thus an unofficial entity, but it is generally considered to be one of three Swedish lands or parts. It is made up of ten provinces, based loosely on the area originally under the jurisdiction of the Göta Court of Appeals (established in 1634), to which the Scanian lands, Gotland and Bohuslän were added in 1658–79:

Administratively, Sweden is not divided into provinces but into counties (see Län). Although Götaland is defined in terms of the historical provinces and not the counties, it roughly comprises the modern counties of Blekinge, Gotland, Halland, Jönköping, Kalmar, Kronoberg, Östergötland, Scania and Västra Götaland.

Geography 

Deep forests are found in the Småland province, there is plenty of farmland in Skåne, and a little bit of both in Västergötland and Östergötland. Coasts are usually relatively flat and consist of archipelagoes as well as sandy beaches. The two largest islands of Sweden are included in Götaland. The two largest lakes of Sweden are also situated mainly in Götaland. The total area is 87,712 km2 with about 4.4 million inhabitants including the second and third largest  urban areas of Sweden.

Map gallery

See also 
 Gotland
 Götaland theory
 Göta highway
 Goths
 Norrland
 Österland

Notes

External links 
 

 
Lands of Sweden